Gary Lawrence Sharpe (born 1947) is a senior United States district judge of the United States District Court for the Northern District of New York.

Education and career

Sharpe graduated from the University at Buffalo with a Bachelor of Arts degree in 1971 and Cornell Law School with a Juris Doctor in 1974. He served as a Senior Assistant District Attorney for Broome County, New York, from 1974 to 1981. He served as a Special Assistant Attorney General for New York State, from 1981 to 1982. He served as an adjunct professor at Binghamton University and Broome Community College, from 1978 to 1982. He served as an Assistant United States Attorney, from 1982 to 1997, serving as a Supervisory Assistant United States Attorney, from 1982 to 1992, Interim United States Attorney, from 1992 to 1994, and Senior Litigation Counsel, from 1994 to 1997. He served as a United States magistrate judge for the Northern District of New York, from 1997 to 2004.

Federal judicial service

Sharpe was nominated to the United States District Court for the Northern District of New York by George W. Bush on April 28, 2003, to a seat vacated by Thomas J. McAvoy, confirmed by the Senate on January 28, 2004, and received his commission on January 29, 2004. He served as Chief Judge from December 16, 2011 until August 31, 2015. He assumed senior status on January 1, 2016.

References

Sources

1947 births
Living people
21st-century American judges
Assistant United States Attorneys
Cornell Law School alumni
Judges of the United States District Court for the Northern District of New York
United States Attorneys for the Northern District of New York
United States district court judges appointed by George W. Bush
United States magistrate judges
University at Buffalo alumni